KRPG-LD, virtual channel 43 (UHF digital channel 24), is a low-powered Azteca America-affiliated television station licensed to Des Moines, Iowa, United States. The station is owned by HC2 Holdings.

History 
The station’s construction permit was issued on December 13, 2011.

Digital channels
The station's digital signal is multiplexed:

References

External links

Low-power television stations in the United States
Innovate Corp.
Television stations in Iowa
Television channels and stations established in 2011
2011 establishments in Iowa